Going Down is a 1983 Australian film about young people living in a share house. One writer said of it that "no film I've seen has better captured the chaotic heartbeat of the young sensation-seeker's Sydney."

The film's one-liner reads: "Four women friends leave behind the feral days of youth after a night of uncontrolled excess in inner-city Sydney during the early 1980s."

Release
The film was self-distributed and ran for 14 weeks in Sydney but performed poorly in Melbourne.

References

External links

Going Down at Australian Screen Online
Going Down at Street Smart Films
Going Down at Oz Movies

Australian comedy-drama films
1983 films
1980s English-language films
1980s Australian films